Jane Ford Aebersold (born 1941) is an American artist specializing in ceramics.

Life and education 
Ford was born in San Angelo, Texas. She received her Bachelor of Fine Arts from Newcomb Art School, Tulane University in 1969. In 1971, she earned an MFA from SUNY College of Ceramics at Alfred University.

Career 
Ford Aebersold taught at Alfred University Summer School, 1971; University of Bridgeport, 1972; Bennington College, 1972 to 1995. Her showings include Group Shows: Ceramics Invitational for the Annual Meeting of the American Ceramic Society, Chicago, Illinois, 1974; Park McCullough House, North Bennington, Vermont, 1974; Approaches: Contemporary Ceramic Education, Philadelphia, Pa. 1975; University of West Virginia, Morgantown, West Va., 1975; 32nd Annual Scripps Invitational, Claremont, California, 1976; Seibu Exhibition, Tokyo, Japan, 1976.

In 1986, Ford Aebersold was invited to "American Ceramics Today," a Barbara Roan symposium held in May of the same year at the Victoria and Albert Museum in London.

Her works are held in the Smithsonian, the Carnegie Museum, and Museum of Fine Arts, Houston.

References

Living people
Tulane University alumni
1941 births
F
F
21st-century American women artists
21st-century ceramists